Punjab Democratic Alliance was formed by Punjab Ekta Party leader Sukhpal Singh Khaira to contest 2019 Indian general election in Punjab on all 13 Lok Sabha seats. PDA was part of the nationwide Mahagathbandhan, and projected Mayawati as its prime ministerial face.

Campaign
On 12 May 2019, BSP-PDA held a massive rally at Langroya village, Nawanshahr and BSP national president Mayawati campaigned for all 13 PDA candidates of Punjab including Sukhpal Singh Khaira and Simarjit Singh Bains alongside BSP candidates former journalist Balwinder Kumar from Jalandhar, retired IAS officer Khushi Ram from Hoshiarpur and international polo player Vikram Singh Sodhi from Anandpur Sahib. Mayawati attacked SAD-BJP and Congress in her speech for failing people of Punjab. Communist leaders Mangat Ram Pasla from the Revolutionary Marxist Party of India (RMPI), Bant Brar from the CPI and Kiranjit Singh Sekhon from the MCPI (U) were also speakers at rally.

Members
Following were the members of alliance:

Former members 
 Shiromani Akali Dal (Taksali). On 2 March 2019 SAD(T) formed coalition with AAP.
Bahujan Samaj Party one of the Prominent member of PDA announced its alliance with Shiromani Akali Dal on 12 June 2021.
After BSP another setback to PDA when Punjab Ekta Party meged with Indian National Congress on 17 June 2021.

Lok Sabha election 2019
Initially Amritsar seat was given to Lok Insaaf Party but later decided to give it to CPI.
Alliance announced to contest on all 13 Lok Sabha seats in Punjab.

Dissolution

References

Defunct political party alliances in India
2019 Indian general election
Politics of Punjab, India